Ambohidratrimo or Antakavana-Andranomiady  is a town in Analamanga Region, in the  Central Highlands of Madagascar, located north at 140 km from the capital of Antananarivo.

The only reserve in Analamanga, Ambohitantely Reserve is located in this town.

References

Populated places in Analamanga